WHNZ (1250 AM) is a commercial radio station licensed to Tampa, Florida.  The station's broadcast license is held by iHM Licenses, LLC, a subsidiary of iHeartMedia.  The station airs a Spanish news/talk format.  WHNZ is one of the eight stations in the Tampa Bay radio market owned by iHeartMedia.

The station's studios are located on West Gandy Boulevard in South Tampa.  The transmitter site is off Memorial Highway in Town 'n' Country, Florida, co-located with sister station 970 AM WFLA.  By day, WHNZ broadcasts at 25,000 watts.  At night, to avoid interfering with other stations on AM 1250, WHNZ reduces power to 5,900 watts.  The station uses a directional antenna at all times.

History

WHNZ is the successor of two radio stations, co-owned WDAE, one of Florida's oldest radio stations, going on the air May 15, 1922 and spending most of its history at AM 1250.  And it also has history on AM 570 in Pinellas Park, which was WHNZ's original dial position and carried some of the same business and financial shows that are heard on today's WHNZ.

On October 24, 1991, what was then WPLP was bought by Paxson Communications, the company founded by multi-millionaire Bud Paxson after he had sold the Home Shopping Network.  Unlike today's WHNZ, Paxson put a full-time business and financial station on AM 570, changing the call sign to WHNZ.  Those call letters refer to "Wins Radio," meaning that it will help you win in the business world.  In 1998, Clear Channel Stations, the previous name of iHeartMedia, bought AM 570.  It also bought AM 620 from Cox Communications, after Cox had moved what was WSUN and its Adult Standards format to co-owned AM 910 in nearby Plant City, Florida, in anticipation of a sale.  Once Clear Channel owned all three frequencies, 570, 620 and 1250, it was able to execute a three-way frequency swap.

On New Year's Day, 2000, WDAE's sports format and call sign moved to AM 620.  WHNZ's business format and call sign moved to AM 1250.  And Clear Channel put a news/talk format on AM 570, giving it the call sign WTBN, which stood for Tampa Bay News.  The following year, Salem Communications took over AM 570, installing a Christian radio format, heard currently on WTBN.

WHNZ was the flagship station of the Tampa Bay Rays baseball team from 2005 to 2008, now heard on WDAE. , WHNZ airs select sporting events moved from WDAE or WFLA due to schedule conflicts. Beginning on May 19, 2018, WHNZ will be the radio home of the Tampa Bay Rowdies.

Weekday mornings began with This Morning, America's First News with Gordon Deal.  In afternoon drive time, WHNZ carried the Todd Schnitt Show.  (Schnitt for many years was a host on co-owned WFLA.  His syndicated show aired in Tampa Bay on WHNZ live at 3 p.m. and was replayed on WFLA at 6 p.m..)  At night, WHNZ carried Fox Sports Radio.   Brokered programs on money, business and health were heard in middays, evenings and weekends.  CBS Radio News began most daytime hours.

On July 26, 2021, WHNZ changed their format to Spanish news/talk, branded as "Acción 1250".

Previous logo

References

External links
WHNZ official website

FCC History Cards for WHNZ

HNZ
News and talk radio stations in the United States
Radio stations established in 1922
Hillsborough County, Florida
IHeartMedia radio stations
1922 establishments in Florida
Radio stations licensed before 1923 and still broadcasting
Spanish-language radio stations in Florida